Castellar  may refer to the places below or to the Castellar typeface.

France
Castellar, Alpes-Maritimes, a commune in the Département of Alpes-Maritimes, Provence-Alpes-Côte d'Azur
Castellare-di-Casinca, a commune in the Haute-Corse department on the island of Corsica
Castellare-di-Mercurio, a commune in the Haute-Corse department of France on the island of Corsica

Italy
Castellar, Piedmont, a former comune in the province of Cuneo
Castellar Guidobono, a comune in the province of Alessandria, Piedmont

Spain
Castellar, Jaén, a municipio in the province of Jaén, Andalusia
Castellar de la Frontera, a municipio in the province of Cádiz, Andalusia
Castellar de la Muela, a municipio in the province of Guadalajara, Castile-La Mancha
Castellar de la Ribera, a municipio in the province of Lleida, Catalonia
Castellar de n'Hug, a municipio in the province of Barcelona, Catalonia
Castellar de Santiago, a municipio in the province of Ciudad Real, Castile-La Mancha
Castellar del Riu, a municipio in the province of Barcelona, Catalonia
Castellar del Vallès, a municipio in the province of Barcelona, Catalonia
El Castellar, a municipio in the province of Teruel, Aragon

See also
 Castelar, a city in Morón Partido, Buenos Aires Province, Argentina